Macarostola pontificalis is a moth of the family Gracillariidae. It is known from the Austral Islands (Rapa and Rurutu) of French Polynesia.

The larvae feed on Metrosideros collina. They mine the leaves of their host plant. The mine starts as a tortuous serpentine mine, ending in a blotch mine at one edge of the leaf, and filled with frass. Later, forming a cone.

References

Macarostola
Moths described in 1928